Humphreys Academy is a private, nonsectarian, school in Belzoni, Mississippi (United States).

Located at 800 Pluck Road in Belzoni, the school serves students in grades K-12.

History

Humphreys Academy was established in 1968 as a segregation academy and is a member of the  Mississippi Association of Independent Schools. In 1969, $160,000 was raised in three weeks to purchase a facility in Silver City. In 1970, an additional $180,000 was raised to build a metal building in Belzoni which included 16 classrooms. In 1970, the IRS revoked Humphreys Academy's tax exempt status because of its racially discriminatory admissions policies.

As of 2016, the school's students were 99% white, while Humphreys County was 75% black.

The school athletic teams are nicknamed the Rebels.

See also

List of private schools in Mississippi
Humphreys County School District and Humphreys County High School

References

External links
 
 – Mississippi Association of Independent Schools

Private middle schools in Mississippi
Private elementary schools in Mississippi
Private high schools in Mississippi
Educational institutions established in 1968
Schools in Humphreys County, Mississippi
Segregation academies in Mississippi